is a Japanese comedy manga series by Honda, serialized online via pixiv Comic website between August 2015 and March 2019. It was collected in four tankōbon volumes by Media Factory. The manga is licensed in North America by Yen Press. An anime television series adaptation by DLE aired from October 8 to December 24, 2018.

Plot
Skull-face Bookseller Honda-san is based on a real life experience of the author Honda during her days as a bookstore employee. The story follows the life of the staff while explaining how a bookstore works.

Characters

The title character and narrator of the story, Honda is drawn with the appearance of a human skeleton wearing a book store uniform. Honda has been working at the book store for 10 years. Being in charge of foreign comics and art books (which is why the boxes containing her books are usually heavy), she is not good at speaking English and will only deal with one English word she knows when dealing with foreign customers.

Honda's co-worker who worked earlier before him. He is drawn with a paper bag covering his head. He is in charge of manga, including yonkoma. Among the workers at the comic section, Honda is his closest friend.

A worker in charge of a girls-oriented section of the store. Hōtai is drawn with bandages covering her face.

A woman who is drawn with a pumpkin head, Lantern is in charge of Shū-E-Sha books. She worked in the store earlier than Honda.

In charge of Kō-D-Sha books, Okitsune is drawn with a kitsune mask on her face.

A worker who is in charge of novels section of the store. She is drawn with omote mask on her face.

In charge of game guide books.

In charge of Sho-G-Kan books, Fullface is drawn with a full face motorcycle helmet on his head.

In charge of Kadokawa men's comics.

The manager of the store and is in charge of the boys' love section of the store. Armor is drawn with a western war helmet on her face

The Section Chief. A really kind woman drawn wearing a pest mask who gets scary when it's related to book distributors.

Editor of the work's author who actually asked to be called by "Azarashi" in Honda's comic.

Anime
An anime adaptation aired from October 8 to December 24, 2018, on Tokyo MX and other channels with each episode running for about 15 minutes. It is adapted by studio DLE and directed by Owl Todoroki. Both the opening theme "ISBN~Inner Sound & book’s Narrative~" and the ending theme "Book-end, Happy-end." are written and performed by TECHNOBOYS PULCRAFT GREEN-FUND. The series aired for 12 episodes. On December 13, 2021, it was announced Discotek Media will release the anime on Blu-ray in March 2022.

Episode list

Notes

References

External links
Manga website 
Anime website - May 2021 archive 

Anime series based on manga
Comedy anime and manga
Discotek Media
Japanese webcomics
Media Factory manga
Kadokawa Dwango franchises
Shōjo manga
Webcomics in print
Yen Press titles